The 1911 New Zealand census was New Zealand's fifteenth national census. The day used for the census was Sunday, 2 April 1911.

The total population of the Dominion of New Zealand was counted as 1,058,313 – an overall increase of 122,004 people or 13.03% over the 1906 census figure. The Māori census counted a total of 49,844, of whom 26,475 were males and 23,369 females, another 2,877 in the general census which made up 5 percent of the total night population. The total enumerated in the European (general) census was 1,008,468 of whom 531,910 were Males and 476,558 Females. The Māori census was held in March, while the general census was held in April.

The Census and Statistics Act 1910 created the Office of the Government Statistician within the Registrar General's Office. The Act (as in the 1911 census report) reiterated the penalties for those who refuse to fill out their census schedules and collectors who disclose the content of individual census schedules.

Population and dwellings
The principal natural divisions in New Zealand are the North, South, and Stewart Islands. The "Distribution of European populations" of the various provincial districts are as follows:

The Maori population of the Dominion (not included above), according to the result of a separate census taken in April 1911, amounted to 49,844. Of these, 46,632 persons were found to be in the North Island, 2,681 persons in the South Island, 63 at Stewart Island, and 219 Maoris and Morioris at the Chatham Islands. There were 249 Maori wives of European husbands enumerated in the European census.

The total population of the Dominion (including Maoris and residents of the Cook and other Pacific Islands) in April 1911, was: Persons, 1,070,910; males, 564,834; females, 506,076; of these, 2,630 were Chinese—2,542 males, 88 females.
The population of the Cook and other Pacific Islands now included within the boundaries of the Dominion was 12,598 persons, of whom 180 were whites or half-castes living as whites. There were also 513 Natives of these islands absent on ships or at the guano islands.

Māori census
The census of the Māori population—that is, full-blooded Maoris, with all half-castes living as members of Native tribes—was taken under the supervision of the officers of the Native Department in April 1911.

Notes: (excludes half-Māori counted in the separate European census) The pure-blood Moriori are practically extinct, and those now claiming to be Morioris are half-caste Moriori-Maoris.

Besides the half-castes (living as Members of Maori Tribes) included in the above table, there were 2,877 half-castes (males, 1,475; females, 1,402) living with and enumerated as Europeans in the other census.

Birthplace
The figures show that of the total population of specified birthplace had New Zealand-born at 69.74% and 30.26% were born-overseas.

Religious denominations

See also
 New Zealand census
 1916 New Zealand census
 1911 Australian census

References

Census
Censuses in New Zealand
New Zealand